The Stewart S-51D Mustang is an American aerobatic homebuilt aircraft that was designed by Jim Stewart and produced by Stewart 51 of Vero Beach, Florida, introduced in 1994. When it was available the aircraft was supplied as a kit for amateur construction.

The S-51D is a 70% scale version of the World War II P-51D Mustang fighter aircraft.

Design and development
Designer Jim Stewart took a leave of absence from his employer, Pratt & Whitney, in 1989 to work on the S-51D's tooling and design. The prototype took flight on 30 March 1994 and by late June had completed its 40 hours of test flying.

The S-51D Mustang features a cantilever low-wing, a two-seats-in-tandem enclosed cockpit under a bubble canopy, retractable conventional landing gear, and a single engine in tractor configuration.

The aircraft is made from sheet aluminum. The specified propeller is a  diameter, constant speed four-bladed Hartzell Propeller unit, that is driven by a  spur gear with a (2.13:1) reduction ratio.

The manufacturer estimated the construction time from the supplied standard kit as 2000 hours. A fast-build kit was also available.

Operational history
By 1998 the company reported that 72 kits had been sold and two aircraft were completed and flying.

In March 2014, 12 examples were registered in the United States with the Federal Aviation Administration, although a total of 19 had been registered at one time.

Specifications (S-51D Mustang)

See also

Cameron P-51G
Jurca Gnatsum
Loehle 5151 Mustang
Papa 51 Thunder Mustang
ScaleWings SW51 Mustang
W.A.R. P-51 Mustang
List of aerobatic aircraft

References

External links
 Photo of a Stewart S-51D Mustang

P-51D Mustang
1990s United States sport aircraft
Single-engined tractor aircraft
Low-wing aircraft
Homebuilt aircraft
Aerobatic aircraft
North American P-51 Mustang replicas
Aircraft first flown in 1994